The year 514 BC was a year of the pre-Julian Roman calendar. In the Roman Empire, it was known as year 240 Ab urbe condita . The denomination 514 BC for this year has been used since the early medieval period, when the Anno Domini calendar era became the prevalent method in Europe for naming years.

Events

By place

Asia 
 Suzhou City in China was founded by Wu Zixu
 King Helu of Wu ascends to the throne of Wu in Zhou Dynasty China. He establishes Suzhou as his capital.
 Darius I leads his Persian army across the Bosphorus and campaigns unsuccessfully against the Scythians on the Danube.

Deaths 

Harmodius and Aristogeiton, two men from ancient Athens who became known as the tyrannicides (τυραννοκτόνοι) after killing the Peisistratid ruler Hipparchus, and were the preeminent symbol of democracy to ancient Athenians.
Hipparchus,  a member of the ruling class of Athens. He was one of the sons of Peisistratus.

References 

 
510s BC